James Cowser (born September 13, 1990) is a former American football outside linebacker. He played college football at Southern Utah. Cowser was Football Championship Subdivision Defensive Player of the Year (2015). He holds the FCS record for career sacks (59) and tackles for loss (80).

Professional career

Cowser signed with the Oakland Raiders after going undrafted in the 2016 NFL Draft. On September 3, 2016, he was waived/injured by the Raiders and placed on injured reserve. On September 10, he was released from the Raiders' injured reserve. He was signed to the practice squad on October 4, 2016. He was promoted to the active roster on November 26, 2016.

On September 1, 2018, Cowser was waived by the Raiders. He was re-signed to the practice squad on October 22, 2018. He was promoted to the active roster on October 30, 2018. He was waived on November 5, 2018, and was re-signed to the practice squad. He was waived on November 13, 2018, and later re-signed to the practice squad.

Cowser signed a reserve/future contract with the Raiders on January 1, 2019. He was waived during final roster cuts on August 30, 2019.

Personal life 
Cowser served as a missionary for the Church of Jesus Christ of Latter-day Saints in Hong Kong and Macau from 2009 to 2011.

Cowser is fluent in Mandarin Chinese and did an internship in NFL's China office in Shanghai.

References

External links
Southern Utah Thunderbirds bio
Oakland Raiders bio

1990 births
Living people
People from Kaysville, Utah
Players of American football from Utah
21st-century Mormon missionaries
Latter Day Saints from Utah
American football defensive ends
Southern Utah Thunderbirds football players
Oakland Raiders players